Alfred "Alf" Milnes was a professional rugby league footballer who played in the 1920s.

Milnes was selected to go on the 1920 Great Britain Lions tour of Australasia. He won caps for Great Britain while at Halifax in 1920 against Australia (2 matches).

References

External links
!Great Britain Statistics at englandrl.co.uk (statistics currently missing due to not having appeared for both Great Britain, and England)

Great Britain national rugby league team players
Halifax R.L.F.C. players
Place of birth missing
Place of death missing
Rugby league hookers
Year of birth missing
Year of death missing